Paokai Haokip (February 1941 – June 6, 2021) was an Indian politician. He was a Member of Parliament, representing Outer Manipur in the Lok Sabha the lower house of India's Parliament.

References

External links
 Official biographical sketch in Parliament of India website

1941 births
2021 deaths
Lok Sabha members from Manipur
Indian National Congress politicians
India MPs 1967–1970
India MPs 1971–1977
People from Kangpokpi district